Proof Range is a locality in the Australian state of South Australia located on the eastern coastline of Gulf St Vincent about  north-northwest of the state capital of Adelaide and about  south of the town centre of Port Wakefield.  Its boundaries were created in January 2000 in respect of the “long established name.”   Its name is derived from the use of the land within its extent for the testing of weapons and ammunition as part of the Port Wakefield Proof and Experimental Establishment.  Proof Range is located within the federal Division of Grey, the state electoral district of Narungga and the local government area known as the Wakefield Regional Council.

See also
List of cities and towns in South Australia

References

	

Towns in South Australia
Gulf St Vincent